Shiladesh is a ravi in Himachal Pradesh, India, approximately 140 km (87 mi) from the state capital, Shimla.

References

Valleys of Himachal Pradesh